Králiky is a village and municipality in Banská Bystrica District in the Banská Bystrica Region of central Slovakia.

History
In historical records the village was first mentioned in 1696.

Geography
The municipality lies at an altitude of 715 metres and covers an area of 1.650 km². It had a population of 542 people on 31 December 2004.

References

External links

Villages and municipalities in Banská Bystrica District